Willi Koslowski (born 17 February 1937) is a former German football player.

Striker Koslowski scored his only goal in his games for West Germany on the day of his debut, the third one of the West Germans in a 3–0 win over Uruguay in April 1962. He added two further appearances, one at the 1962 FIFA World Cup against Switzerland (2–1) at Estadio Nacional de Chile on 3 June, the same year.

References

1937 births
Living people
German footballers
Germany international footballers
Germany B international footballers
Germany under-21 international footballers
FC Schalke 04 players
Rot-Weiss Essen players
1962 FIFA World Cup players
Bundesliga players
Association football forwards
Sportspeople from Gelsenkirchen
Footballers from North Rhine-Westphalia